Bihariganj is a city in the Madhepura district of Bihar, India. Bihariganj is located in Northeast India and is part of the Mithila region.

History
The ancient name of Bihariganj was "Nishankhpur Kodha". In medieval times, Bihariganj was ruled by the Sen dynasty. In the 16th century, the main stream of the Koshi River flowed to Bihariganj, named "ha-ha dhar", with a small market approximately 2 kilometers away. Gamail Gola was used as a local market where jute, rice, wheat, and other commercial items were purchased and bought by local people. Bihariganj Railway station is one of the oldest railway stations in northern India.

Geography
Bihariganj is the central market of its surrounded villages. It is surrounded by villages like Rajghat, Gangaura, Madhukarchak, Mohanpur, Laxmipur, Belahi, Babhangama, Tulsia, Baijnathpur, Vishanpur, Gamail, Mahikhand, Madhuvan Tintenga, and others. There are several chauk (zebra crossing) such as Panchwati Chauk, Jawahar Chauk, Shastri Chauk, Viswkarma Chauk, Gandhi Chauk, Subhash Chauk, and Babhangama Chauk. Bihariganj is a block in Madhepura district. It belongs to the Kosi division.

Demographics

In the 2011 census, the total population of Bihariganj was 135,534, out of which 52% were male and 48% female. Based on population, Bihariganj was 7th in Madhepura district and 374th in Bihar. The town had a total of 27,870 households spread across 25 villages and 12 panchayats. Most of the area is rural except for the suburbs of the main town.

It has a literacy ratio of 58% with 61,527 total people literate. In terms of literacy, Bihariganj ranks at 1st in the Madhepura district and ranked 357th in Bihar.

Maithili is the local language. Hindi and Urdu is also spoken.

According to the Planning Commission of India, the poverty headcount ratio is 19.83% in Bihariganj.

Employment 
Bihariganj has a total of 48,905 people employed. Out of total employed people, 32,914 are male and 15,991 are female. The employment ratio is 36%. Bihariganj stands at 11th in Madhepura district and ranked 159th in Bihar.

Economy
This town has many textile businesses. It also produces jute and sugar. People are dependent mainly on business and agriculture.

Agriculture
Food crops include paddy and wheat. Other crops include corn, mango, sugarcane, sunflower, mustard, jack fruits, banana, and seasonal Indian vegetables.

Culture
Ramnavmi Yatra is famous in Bihariganj. There are many temples such as the Chandika Temple, Durga Temple, Hanuman temple, and Shiva Temple. It is a mainly Mithila-oriented society.

Educational institutions

Colleges

Bhatu Shah College
Yashoda Sitaram College
Garib Chandra College
Hansi Mandal Inter College

Schools
Sharda Vidya Mandir school Shastri chowk bihariganj
New Modern Public School
C.D. Saraswati Shishu Mandir
Saraswati Vidya Mandir
Mithila Public School
Real Modern Public School
St. Michal School
Middle School Bihariganj
High School Bihariganj
Gayatri Jhawar Kanya Middle school
Gayatri Jhawar Kanya High school
Baal Vikash Aawasiya School
Bhatu Shah High School

See also
 Bihariganj (Community development block)
 Bihariganj (Vidhan Sabha constituency)
 Madhepura
 Barauni-Katihar section (railway line)

References
1. "Bihariganj Block". Blocks of Madhepura. brandbihar.com.
2. "Republic of India, Bihar". Geo Hive.
3. http://www.livemint.com/Opinion/VT7jdQzGKeVIop2q9yeKzH/Bihar-wants-even-more.html
3. http://www.neighbourhoodinfo.co.in/city/Bihar/Madhepura/Bihariganj

External links
 official website of district headquarter madhepura

Cities and towns in Madhepura district